Rob van Esdonk (born 25 October 1964) is a Dutch former kickboxer and mixed martial artist who competed in the heavyweight division.

Kickboxing record

|-
|-  bgcolor="#FFBBBB"
| 1999-02-27 || Loss ||align=left| Jérôme Le Banner || Les Stars du Ring || Marseille, France || KO (left hook) || 1 || 2:28
|-
|-  bgcolor="#FFBBBB"
| 1998-06-06 || Loss ||align=left| Stefan Leko || K-1 Fight Night '98, Final || Zürich, Switzerland || KO (punches) || 3 || 1:57
|-
! style=background:white colspan=9 |
|-
|-  bgcolor="#CCFFCC"
| 1998-06-06 || Win ||align=left| Xhavit Bajrami || K-1 Fight Night '98, Semi Finals || Zürich, Switzerland || TKO (doctor stoppage) || 1 || 2:49
|-
|-  bgcolor="#FFBBBB"
| 1998-06-06 || Loss ||align=left| Achille Roger || K-1 Fight Night '98, Quarter Finals || Zürich, Switzerland || TKO || 4 || 
|-
|-  bgcolor="#FFBBBB"
| 1997-05-11 || Loss ||align=left| Pedro Rizzo || Nikko T. Press Productions: Battle of the Best, Semi Finals || 's-Hertogenbosch, Netherlands || TKO (corner stoppage) || 3 || 
|-
|-  bgcolor="#FFBBBB"
| 1994-12-10 || Loss ||align=left| Andy Hug || K-1 Legend || Nagoya, Japan || KO (left hook) || 4 || 0:55
|-
! style=background:white colspan=9 |
|-
|-  bgcolor="#FFBBBB"
| 1994-04-30 || Loss ||align=left| Peter Aerts || K-1 Grand Prix '94, Quarter Finals || Tokyo, Japan || KO (right high kick) || 3 || 1:10
|-
|-  bgcolor="#FFBBBB"
| 1993-09-19 || Loss ||align=left| Peter Aerts || The Night of the Gladiators || Amsterdam, Netherlands || KO (right hook) || 4 || 0:56
|-
! style=background:white colspan=9 |
|-
|-
| colspan=9 | Legend:

Mixed martial arts record

|-
| Loss
| align=center| 4-3
| Peter Mulder
| TKO (knees and punches)
| Rings Holland: Armed and Dangerous
| 
| align=center| 1
| align=center| 1:03
| Utrecht, Netherlands
| 
|-
| Win
| align=center| 4-2
| Andre Tete
| TKO (punches)
| Rings Holland: Born Invincible
| 
| align=center| 1
| align=center| 0:43
| Alytus, Alytus County, Lithuania
| 
|-
| Loss
| align=center| 3-2
| Andre Tete
| KO (punch)
| Rings Holland: Some Like It Hard
| 
| align=center| 2
| align=center| 0:28
| Utrecht, Netherlands
| 
|-
| Win
| align=center| 3-1
| Peter Verschuren
| Submission (scarf hold armlock)
| Rings Holland: Di Capo Di Tutti Capi
| 
| align=center| 1
| align=center| 2:41
| Utrecht, Netherlands
| 
|-
| Win
| align=center| 2-1
| Big Mo T
| TKO (knee to the body)
| Rings Holland: There Can Only Be One Champion
| 
| align=center| 1
| align=center| 4:58
| Utrecht, Netherlands
| 
|-
| Loss
| align=center| 1-1
| Tsuyoshi Kosaka
| Submission (heel hook)
| Rings Holland: The King of Rings
| 
| align=center| 2
| align=center| 0:57
| Amsterdam, North Holland, Netherlands
| 
|-
| Win
| align=center| 1-0
| Dennis Crouweel
| TKO (referee stoppage from a broken nose)
| Rings Holland: The Final Challenge
| 
| align=center| 1
| align=center| 2:38
| Amsterdam, North Holland, Netherlands
|

See also
List of male mixed martial artists

References

1964 births
Living people
Dutch male kickboxers
Dutch male mixed martial artists
Heavyweight kickboxers
Heavyweight mixed martial artists
Mixed martial artists utilizing Muay Thai
Dutch Muay Thai practitioners
Sportspeople from 's-Hertogenbosch